The 2010 Individual Long Track World Championship was the 2010 and 40th edition of the FIM speedway Individual Long Track World Championship season. Champion was determined in six finals between 30 May and 19 September 2010.

The Championship was won by Joonas Kylmäkorpi, who won three of six Grand Prix event and scoring 140 points. Kylmäkorpi beat Theo Pijper (120 pts) and Richard Speiser (103 pts). Top seven riders get qualify to the Grand Prix' next season, and next eight riders qualify to the Long Track Challenge. The defending World Champion, Gerd Riss crashed at Final Three and he did not participate at next events (after Final Two he was second placed, losing three points to Kylmäkorpi).

Riders 
There will be seventeen permanent riders:
 top seven placed riders from the 2009 Individual Long Track World Championship,
 top seven riders from the Long Track Challenge
 three riders nominated by the CCP for all Final Meetings.

One Wild Card and two Track Reserve riders will be nominated by organising national federation

In case of the absence of one or more riders in the final meetings, the first available Qualified Substitute  rider or riders will be elevated for that meeting, and take the place(s) of the relevant missing rider(s). The list of Qualified Substitute riders was published by the CCP before the season according to Long Track Challenge last year.

A starting position draw for each final meeting will be balloted by the CCP.

2009 Championship 
 (1)  Gerd Riss
 (2)  Stephane Tresarrieu
 (3)  Dirk Fabriek
 (4)  Matthias Kröger
 (5)  Glen Phillips
 (6)  Theo Pijper (Dutch, starting with French licency)
 (7)  Joonas Kylmäkorpi

Long Track Challenge 
 (8)  Stephan Katt
 (9)  Herbert Rudolph
 (10)  Alessandro Milanese withdraw and was replaced by first Qualified Substitutes rider  Jan Pape
 (11)  Jorg Tebbe
 (12)  Richard Speiser
 (13)  Enrico Janoschka
 (14)  Mathieu Tresarrieu

Nominations 
 (15)  Richard Wolff
 (16)  Jannick de Jong
 (17)  Andrew Appleton

Wild cards and track reserves 
 Final One in Pfarrkirchen, Germany
 (18)  Martin Smolinski
 (19)  Bernd Diener
 (20)  Marcel Dachs
 Final Two in Saint-Macaire, France
 (18)  Jérôme Lespinase
 (19)  Maxime Mazeau
 (20)  Philippe Ostyn
 Final Three in Marmande, France
 (18)  Jérôme Lespinase
 (19)  Philippe Ostyn
 (20)  Gabriel Dubernard
 Final Four in Eenrum, Netherlands
 (18)  Mark Stiekema
 (19)  Jeffrey Woortman
 (20)  Sjoerd Rozenberg
 Final Five in Vechta, Germany
 (18)  Daniel Rath
 (19)  Martin Smolinski
 (20)  Marcel Dachs
 Final Six in Mariánské Lázně, Czech Republic
 (18)  Josef Franc
 (19)  Michael Hádek
 (20)  Zdenek Schneiderwind

Qualified Substitutes 
 (21)  Jerome Lespinasse
 (22)  Vladimir Trofimiv
 (23)  Rene Lehtinen
 (24)  Mark Stiekema
 (25)  Massimo Mora
 (26)  Maxime Mazeau

Grand Prix

Format 

The riders' starting position draw will be balloted before each Final Meeting by the CCP.

Each Qualifying Round, Semi-Final, Long Track Challenge or Final Round must be organised in 15 heats with 6 riders in each heat (heats will consist of 4 laps). Heats 1 to 12 are called Qualifying Heats and must be conducted according to the following schedule of heats (like in a table)

After heat 12, there will be an intermediate classification from the 1st to the 20th place according to the total race points each rider has scored during the Qualifying heats. The 12 top-scoring riders from the Qualifying heats will qualify for the Semi-Finals:
 Semi-final one (heat 13): 1st, 4th, 5th, 8th, 9th and 12th in the intermediate classification,
 Semi-final two (heat 14): 2nd, 3rd, 6th, 7th, 10th and 11th in the intermediate classification.
Riders' gate positions for each Semi-Final (Heats 13 and 14) will be chosen by the riders, in the order determined by their position in the Classification after qualifying heats.

The 6 top-scoring riders from the second intermediate classification after the Qualifying Heats and Semi-finals will qualify for the Final (Heat 15). Riders' gate positions for the Final heat (Heat 15) will be chosen by the riders. The draw order shall be determined by the second intermediate classification (after the Qualifying and Semi-Final Heats).

If a rider cannot take part in a Semi-Final or Final heat for which he has already qualified, he will automatically be considered placed in the last position of the heat and will be not replaced by a following rider in the Intermediate Classification list.

Results 
The total points scored by each rider from the Qualifying heats, Semi-final and Final heats (Heats 1–15) in a Final Meeting will be credited as World Championship points in the overall championship and the Intermediate World Championship Classification will be according to these credited points.

The total race points scored by each rider during the whole event (Heats 1–15) will determine the final classification for the Final Meeting. Positions 1 to 6 in the Final Meeting Classification will be according to the result of the final heat (Heat 15) irrespective of the total race points scored.

Classification 

The FIM Long Track World Champion will be the rider having collected the most points at the end of the Long Track World Championship Final Meeting series.

In case of riders tied on World Championship points in the Intermediate Classification, the better placed rider in the last Final Meeting will be considered the better placed rider.

In case of riders involved in a tie on the Final Overall World Championship Classification, the following will apply:
 Run-off for 1st, 2nd and 3rd place.
 Run-off for 7th place, which is the last qualifying place for the following year's Final rounds.
 For all other placing, the better placed rider in the last Final meeting will be considered the better placed rider.

See also 
 2010 Team Long Track World Championship
 2010 Speedway Grand Prix

References 

 
2010
World
Speedway competitions in the Czech Republic
Speedway competitions in France
Speedway competitions in Germany
Speedway competitions in the Netherlands
2010 in Dutch motorsport
2010 in German motorsport
2010 in French motorsport
2010 in Czech sport
2010 in Norwegian sport